Ukrainian Supreme Liberation Council (UHVR) was an umbrella organization that combined various Ukrainian nationalists and anti-Soviet partisans until the early 1950s.

The council was formed in July 1944. UHVR united Organization of Ukrainian Nationalists (OUN) and Ukrainian Insurgent Army (UPA). Not all members of the Ukrainian Supreme Liberation Council were simultaneously (or previously) members of the Organization of Ukrainian Nationalists. After the end of the Second World War, the council co-ordinated resistance efforts in Soviet Ukraine. It also organised the boycott of the Soviet-sponsored elections in 1946. After the killing of Roman Shukhevych in 1950 by Soviet NKVD forces during battle, most members of the council were arrested, and the council ceased to exist.

Members of UHVR abroad headed by Ivan Hrynokh formed External Representation group of the council (ZP UHVR), which popularised the efforts of the Ukrainian dissident movement in the West.

The ZP UVHR had more long lasting success, with former OUN-B leader Mykola Lebed linked to it. In 1951, in Munich, the UVPR began publishing the bi-weekly newspaper "Suchasna Ukraina" and the monthly "Ukrainian Literary Gazette", on the basis of which the magazine "Suchasnist" was published in 1961, affiliated with CIA-linked "Prolog Corporation". It was an important pan-ideological magazine for the emigre community during the Cold War.

References

Political history of Ukraine
Defunct unicameral legislatures
Governments in exile during World War II